Joseph Leverett Cunningham (February 26, 1867 – July 27, 1951) was an American tennis player. He competed in the men's singles events at the 1904 Summer Olympics.

References

1867 births
1951 deaths
American male tennis players
Olympic tennis players of the United States
Tennis players at the 1904 Summer Olympics
Place of birth missing